Ryan Woolridge (born November 16, 1996) is an American professional basketball player for the Oklahoma City Blue of the NBA G League. He played college basketball for the North Texas Mean Green and the Gonzaga Bulldogs.

Early life and high school career
In fifth or sixth grade, Wooldridge played on the same Amateur Athletic Union (AAU) team as future Gonzaga teammate Admon Gilder. Woolridge attended Lake Ridge High School in Mansfield, Texas. While in high school, his mother was diagnosed with breast cancer. He did not play on a prominent AAU team as he had some bad experiences with the program. Woolridge received recruiting interest from several Big 12 programs and intended to sign with Texas before a coaching change. Instead, Woolridge signed with San Diego.

College career

North Texas
Despite signing with San Diego out of high school, Woolridge never played a game for the team. Shortly after the start of his freshman season, his father, Columbus, was diagnosed with prostate cancer and he opted to transfer closer to home, to North Texas. After gaining eligibility in December 2016, Woolridge became an important piece for the Mean Green. As a freshman, he averaged 9.6 points, 4.9 rebounds and 3.2 assists per game and led the team with 41 steals. He averaged 12.7 points, 5.8 assists, 5.2 rebounds, and 1.3 steals per game as a sophomore, shooting 49.6 percent from the floor. On December 5, 2018, Woolridge posted a triple-double of 12 points, 10 rebounds and 10 assists as North Texas defeated Indiana State, 80–69. As a junior, Woolridge averaged 11.7 points, 6.0 rebounds, and 5.0 assists per game, earning Third Team All-Conference USA honors. During his junior season, Woolridge played with pain in both knees culminating in a stress fracture in his patella during the Conference USA tournament which required two screws in his leg.

Gonzaga
For his senior season, Woolridge decided to transfer to Gonzaga as a graduate transfer, choosing the Bulldogs over Oklahoma, Minnesota, Arkansas, and Arizona. He won praise for his defensive acumen at Gonzaga, holding Nico Mannion of Arizona to seven points. Woolridge averaged 10.1 points, 4.6 rebounds and 4.5 assists per game as a senior.

Professional career
On July 12, 2020, Woolridge signed with Medi Bayreuth of the Basketball Bundesliga. Woolridge left the team on December 29, 2020 after averaging 7.7 points and 3.1 assists in seven games. He then landed with the Oklahoma City Blue of the NBA G League, making his debut for the team on February 11, 2021. In 14 games, he averaged 6.6 points, 4.1 rebounds, 4.0 assists and 1.3 steals per game. On July 24, 2021, Woolridge signed with Iraklis Thessaloniki of the Greek Basket League. On November 10, 2022, he re-signed with the Oklahoma City Blue.

Career statistics

College

|-
| style="text-align:left;"| 2016–17
| style="text-align:left;"| North Texas
| 21 || 12 || 28.5 || .503 || .357 || .575 || 4.9 || 3.2 || 2.0 || .1 || 9.6
|-
| style="text-align:left;"| 2017–18
| style="text-align:left;"| North Texas
| 38 || 37 || 36.6 || .496 || .315 || .506 || 5.2 || 5.8 || 1.4 || .4 || 12.7
|-
| style="text-align:left;"| 2018–19
| style="text-align:left;"| North Texas
| 30 || 27 || 32.8 || .469 || .333 || .581 || 5.9 || 4.8 || 1.9 || .3 || 11.7
|-
| style="text-align:left;"| 2019–20
| style="text-align:left;"| Gonzaga
| 33 || 33 || 32.7 || .529 || .432 || .610 || 4.5 || 4.2 || 1.4 || .2 || 10.1
|- class="sortbottom"
| style="text-align:center;" colspan="2"| Career
| 122 || 109 || 33.2 || .497 || .366 || .555 || 5.1 || 4.7 || 1.6 || .3 || 11.2'''

Personal life
Woolridge is the son of Columbus and Rochelle Woolridge. He has an older sister, Hunter.

References

External links
Gonzaga Bulldogs bio
North Texas Mean Green bio

1996 births
Living people
American expatriate basketball people in Germany
American men's basketball players
Basketball players from Texas
Gonzaga Bulldogs men's basketball players
Iraklis Thessaloniki B.C. players
Medi Bayreuth players
North Texas Mean Green men's basketball players
Oklahoma City Blue players
People from Mansfield, Texas
Point guards
Sportspeople from the Dallas–Fort Worth metroplex